Lars-Gunnar Rehnberg is a Swedish retired footballer. Rehnberg made 29 Allsvenskan appearances for Djurgården and scored 1 goal.

References

Swedish footballers
Djurgårdens IF Fotboll players
Association footballers not categorized by position
Year of birth missing